Avecia, a part of Nitto Denko Inc., is a private biotechnology company focused on the development and manufacture of novel medicines using biotechnology techniques. Avecia operates as a contract manufacturing organization (CMO), specializing in oligonucleotide production.

Avecia has two US FDA-audited facilities, one near Boston, MA, and the second in Cincinnati, OH. The combined capacity of these two sites allows Avecia to handle oligonucleotide programs from the pre-clinical through commercial stages. In 2016 Avecia acquired the assets of Irvine Pharmaceutical Services and Avrio Biopharmaceuticals.

It was named as one of the top companies in Oligonucleotide Synthesis industry in January 2019.

References

External links
 Avecia.com
 Oligo manufacture
 Process Development
 Pre-Clinical Services
 Quality

Biotechnology companies of the United States